Atlanta's transportation system is a complex infrastructure of several systems, including 47.6 miles of heavy rail, 91 bus transit routes, 1,600 licensed taxis, a comprehensive network of freeways, the world's busiest airport and over 45 miles of bike paths.

The city began as a railroad town, and remains a major rail junction and home of major classification yards for Norfolk Southern and CSX. Amtrak provides the only remaining passenger service via its daily Crescent service to cities between New Orleans and New York.

Atlanta's subway system, operated by MARTA, is the eighth-busiest in the United States. The rail system is complemented by MARTA's bus system, the 14th-largest in the country.

A 2011 Brookings Institution study placed Atlanta 91st of 100 metro areas for transit accessibility.  Reliance on cars has resulted in heavy traffic and has helped make Atlanta one of the more polluted cities in the country. The Clean Air Campaign was created in 1996 to help reduce pollution in metro Atlanta. Since 2008, Metro Atlanta has ranked at or near the top of lists of longest average commute times and worst traffic in the country.

Background

History 
The history of Atlanta's transportation system began in 1836, when the state of Georgia decided to build a railroad to the Midwest and chose Atlanta to be the Terminus. Between 1845 and 1854 rail lines arrived from four different directions and Atlanta became a transportation hub of the Southeast. In 1871 horse-cars began to be used in the city but Electric Streetcars arrived in 1889. by 1926, passenger service peaked at 96,794,273 people per year. The introduction of Trackless trolleys in 1937 led to the gradual decline and eventual end of electric street car service. The last streetcar was run in 1949 by Georgia Power, only Trolleys and Buses were left.

During the period when the system was at its maximum size trolley-buses carried 80 percent of all transit riders By the end of 1949 Atlanta had a fleet of 453 trolleybuses, the largest in the United States, and it retained this distinction until 1952, when it was surpassed by Chicago. Since the 1920s Georgia Power had been losing money and ridership, and during a five-week-long transit strike the company began looking for buyers. Clement Evans, Granger Hansell and Inman Brandon with Leland Anderson formed the Atlanta Transit Company and purchased the transportation properties on June 23, 1950

In late 1962 Atlanta Transit decided to phase out all trolleybus service the next year, to avoid the expense of having to string new overhead wires when extending service to new areas.  There were 39 trolleybus routes at the end of 1962.  Another reason cited was the anticipated high cost and difficulty of obtaining new trolleybuses to replace ATC's large fleet, which ranged in age from 14 to 17 years. Since 1959, when Marmon-Herrington ceased production of trolleybuses, no manufacturer in North America was still making the electric vehicles (a situation which lasted until the late 1960s).  At the beginning of 1963 the active fleet included 273 trolleybuses. The entire electric system was converted to diesel buses over a period of less than one month in September 1963.  Atlanta's last trolleybus service operated on the night of September 27, 1963.

Originally constructed as a four to six lane expressway in the 1950s, the stretch of I-85 between the southern merge with I-75 and North Druid Hills Road was reconstructed as part of the Georgia Department of Transportation's Freeing the Freeways program. This project included rebuilding all overpasses, new HOV-ready ramps (with the system implemented in 1996), and a widening of freeway capacity.

The portion of the highway from the Buford Highway Connector to GA 400 was constructed during the early 1980s, and was designed as a replacement for the original four-lane routing of I-85 (now GA 13). In addition, the new viaduct was designed to accommodate connections to the Georgia 400 tollway (then in planning), HOV lanes, and a bridge carrying the MARTA North Line (then under construction).

I-285 was opened in 1969 at a cost of $90 million as a four-lane highway throughout (two lanes each way).

Until 2000, the state of Georgia used the sequential interchange numbering system on all of its Interstate Highways. The first exit on each highway would begin with the number "1" and increase numerically with each exit. In 2000, the Georgia Department of Transportation switched to a mileage-based exit system, in which the exit number corresponded to the nearest milepost.

Mass transit use and car ownership
Atlanta is notable for being the 25th city with the most homes without cars and has a fair use of public transportation with 14.85% of workers using public transportation, while 12.7% of self-driving commuters spend more than an hour getting to work.

Environmental and social issues

Commuting/modal split
Of all workers aged 16 and above commuting within the city, 77.85% drove alone, 8.95% carpooled and 13.2% used public transportation according to the 2010 American Community Survey 1-Year Estimates.

Mass transit

MARTA

MARTA is composed of both heavy rail rapid transit and a bus transit system that operates primarily within the boundaries of Fulton, DeKalb, and Clayton counties. In addition to Atlanta itself, the transit agency serves the following incorporated places within these three core counties: Alpharetta, Avondale Estates, Chamblee, Clarkston, College Park, Decatur, Doraville, Dunwoody, East Point, Ellenwood, Fairburn, Forest Park, Hapeville, Jonesboro, Lithonia, Lovejoy, Morrow, Palmetto, Pine Hill, Riverdale, Roswell, Sandy Springs, Stone Mountain, Union City. Outside of the immediate service area, MARTA also serves two bus routes to Cobb County, one serving Cumberland Boulevard Transfer Center, and the other serving Six Flags Over Georgia.

Rail
The MARTA rapid rail system has  of railroad tracks and 38 rail stations located on four service lines: the Red Line (prior to October 2009, known as the North-South Line), Gold Line (former Northeast-South Line), Blue Line (former East-West Line), and the Green Line (former Proctor Creek Line). The tracks for this system are a combination of elevated, ground-level, and underground tracks.

No artificial lining of any kind was installed in the walls or the ceilings of this station, or the adjacent tunnels, but rather, the architects and civil engineers for this station decided to leave these with their rugged gneiss rock walls.

MARTA switched to a color-based identification system in October 2009. Formerly, the lines were named based upon their terminal stations, namely: Airport, Doraville, North Springs, H. E. Holmes, Bankhead, King Memorial, Candler Park, Indian Creek; or by their compass direction. During the transition between the two naming systems, all stations on the Red and Gold lines are using their original orange signs, and all stations on the Blue and Green lines are using their original blue signs.

All the rail lines have an ultimate nexus at the Five Points station, located in downtown Atlanta. MARTA trains are operated using the Automatic Train Control system, with one human train operator per train present to make announcements, operate the doors, and to operate the trains manually in case of a control system malfunction or an emergency. Many of the suburban stations have free daily and paid long-term parking in park and ride lots. These stations also have designated kiss and ride passenger drop-off areas close to the stations' entrances.

There are currently plans for three extensions for the heavy rail: Connect 400, I-20 East, and West Line Corridors. As part of the 2016 vote for expanding MARTA within the City of Atlanta, the West Line Corridor was included as a project to potentially receive funding and be built by MARTA.

Additionally, MARTA is planning a Light Rail Transit route between Lindbergh and Avondale Stations called the Clifton Corridor. As part of the 2016 vote for expanding MARTA within the City of Atlanta, the first four miles of the route were included as projects to potentially receive funding and be built by MARTA. The final four miles of the route would be funded by a future DeKalb County referendum to fund MARTA expansions within the county.

Finally, as part of the 2014 Clayton County referendum to join MARTA, the agency is examining expanding high-capacity transit into Clayton County. MARTA is considering a number of different modes, however the route was originally pitched as the first Commuter Rail Transit in the Atlanta metro.

In 2020, developers broke ground on a 305-unit apartment complex adjacent to the King Memorial MARTA Station.

Bus

MARTA's bus system serves a wider area than the rail system, serving areas in Fulton and DeKalb counties such as the cities of Roswell and Alpharetta in North Fulton, along with South DeKalb. As of 2017, MARTA has 550 diesel and compressed natural gas buses that cover over 101 bus routes. Two MARTA bus routes, the 12 and 201 provide limited service to Cobb County, terminating at Cumberland Transfer Center and Six Flags Over Georgia respectively. All of the MARTA bus lines feed into or intersect MARTA rail lines as well.

In addition to the free parking adjacent to many rail stations, MARTA also operates five Park and Ride lots serviced only by bus routes: Windward Parkway, Mansell Road, Goldsmith, Barge Road, South Fulton, and Riverdale. The Panola Road Park and Ride lot is jointly operated with GRTA.

In May 2016, MARTA completed its Comprehensive Operations Analysis, which outlined a series of changes to its service across the system, but primarily focused on changes to the bus network. The analysis proposed a series of frequency changes, realignments, and additional service levels, including Arterial Rapid Transit, for high-ridership and more neighborhood-focused bus routes alike. Starting in 2017, MARTA began implementing these changes jointly with promised upgrades as part of the 2016 City of Atlanta expansion referendum. These changes will come both during MARTA's normal scheduled route modification dates, as well as on additional dates as part of the agency's "Fast Track" program.

As part of the 2016 vote for expanding MARTA within the City of Atlanta, a Bus Rapid Transit route along Northside Dr. has been planned.

Atlanta Streetcar

The Atlanta Streetcar system, which opened at the end of 2014 and is owned and managed by the City of Atlanta, rather than by MARTA, is a streetcar line serving the downtown area. It runs from Centennial Olympic Park along Edgewood and Auburn avenues to the King Center and has a stop at MARTA's Peachtree Center Station.

In June 2017, it was announced that MARTA would be taking over the operations of the Atlanta Streetcar from the City of Atlanta.

Expansions are planned to follow the Atlanta Streetcar System Plan, released at the end of 2015. Included in this plan is the 22 mile transit component of the Atlanta BeltLine. As part of the 2016 vote for expanding MARTA within the City of Atlanta, the Atlanta BeltLine Loop, Irwin-AUC Line, Downtown-Capitol Ave Line, Crosstown Midtown Line, Crosstown Crescent Line, and Peachtree-Ft Mac-Barge Rd Line were all included as projects to potentially receive funding and be built by MARTA.

Other bus
The Georgia Regional Transportation Authority operates 28 regional commuter Xpress bus routes, primarily into Downtown Atlanta, though there are routes that serve Perimeter Center and Doraville directly.

Cobb Linc provides 11 local bus routes within Cobb County, and 8 commuter buses to and from Downtown and Midtown Atlanta.

Gwinnett County Transit provides local bus service within Gwinnett County and commuter bus service to and from Downtown and Midtown Atlanta.

Emory University operates The Cliff shuttle bus system with over 50 buses, 21 routes, and 200,000 rides per month. The Georgia Institute of Technology operates the Stinger Shuttles and the Georgia Tech Trolley, providing service between its campus, MARTA rail stations, and the local communities. Private bus companies operate pesero (Mexico-style jitney) service along Buford Highway.

Roads and freeways

With a comprehensive network of freeways that radiate out from the city, Atlantans rely on their cars as the dominant mode of transportation in the region. Atlanta is mostly encircled by Interstate 285, a beltway locally known as "the Perimeter" which has come to mark the boundary between the city and close-in suburbs ("ITP": Inside The Perimeter) from the outer suburbs and exurbs: ("OTP": Outside The Perimeter).

Toll lanes
The Peach Pass toll lane system is being implemented as part of the Georgia Department of Transportation's Major Mobility Improvement Program (MMIP). As of April 2019, three facilities are open to traffic.  The first, which opened in 2011 on I-85 in Gwinnett County, was the conversion of the existing HOV (High Occupancy Vehicle) lane to a HOT (High Occupancy Toll) lane.  The second, on I-75 in Henry and Clayton Counties, opened in 2017 as the first fully barrier-separated section.  The third, known as the Northwest Corridor, opened in September 2018 on I-75 and I-575 in Cobb and Cherokee Counties.  Both of the I-75 facilities are reversible, meaning that the lanes flow towards downtown Atlanta in the morning, and away from downtown Atlanta in the afternoon.  Further expansion of the toll lane system will include GA 400 from I-285 to Windward Parkway, and all of I-285 north of I-20.  Construction of remaining facilities is expected to be complete by 2028.

Major highways
Three major interstate highways converge in Atlanta; I-20 runs east to west across town, I-75 runs from northwest to southeast, and I-85 runs from northeast to southwest. I-75 and I-85 combine to form the Downtown Connector through the middle of the city, carrying more than 340,000 vehicles per day, making it one of the ten most congested segments of interstate highway in the United States. The intersection of I-85 and I-285 in Doraville is nicknamed Spaghetti Junction. Metro Atlanta is also approached by Interstates 575, 675, and 985;  Georgia 400, 141, and 316; and US 78; all terminate near the Perimeter.

Personal transportation

Private automobiles
Reliance on cars has resulted in heavy traffic and has helped make Atlanta one of the more polluted cities in the country. The Clean Air Campaign was created in 1996 to help reduce pollution in metro Atlanta. Since 2008, Metro Atlanta has ranked at or near the top of lists of longest average commute times and worst traffic in the country.

Pedestrians and cycling

Cycling is a growing mode of transportation in Atlanta, taking 1.1% of all commutes in 2009, up from 0.3% in 2000, and organizations like the Atlanta Bicycle Coalition continue to lobby for increased accessibility to bicyclists. However, heavy automobile traffic, Atlanta's famed hills, the lack of bike lanes on many streets, and difficulty in crossing major streets deter many residents from cycling frequently in Atlanta. The BeltLine which will include multi-use, paved trails, may help the city achieve this goal.

Additional multi-use trails currently being developed throughout Atlanta include the PATH400 and the Peachtree Creek Greenway.

Starting in June 2016, Atlanta received a bike sharing program, known as Relay Bike Share, with 100 bikes in Downtown and Midtown, which expanded to 500 bikes at 65 stations as of April 2017.

Port infrastructure

Airports

Hartsfield-Jackson Atlanta International Airport , the world's busiest airport as measured by passenger traffic and by aircraft traffic, offers air service to over 150 U.S. destinations and more than 80 international destinations in 52 countries, with over 2,700 arrivals and departures daily. Delta Air Lines maintains its largest hub at the airport. The MARTA rail system has a station in the airport terminal, and provides direct service to Downtown, Midtown, Buckhead, and Sandy Springs. The major general aviation airports near the city proper are DeKalb-Peachtree Airport  and Fulton County Airport/Brown Field .
Fulton County Airport  is a local Class D airport located just west of Atlanta, and run by Fulton County of the U.S. state of Georgia.  It is the nearest airport to Hartsfield-Jackson Atlanta International Airport, and handles much of the general aviation traffic that would otherwise go there.

Current, future and proposed projects

Beltline

In July 2012, there will be a referendum on a 1-cent sales tax (SPLOST) to fund traffic and road improvements. If approved, the tax will fund several streetcar routes along portions of the BeltLine trail and connections onto MARTA stations and with the Downtown Loop streetcar. Funding for the lines is provided by an $8 billion grant being pitched by Marta to state government.

Clifton Corridor

The Clifton Corridor is a proposed light rail line which would run from Lindbergh Center eastwards, following the existing CSX rail corridor to Emory University, continuing along the northern edge of Decatur via Suburban Plaza on N. Decatur Rd. and on to the Avondale MARTA station. Funding is also dependent on the same eight-billion-dollar grant currently proposed.

Rail
There are currently two proposals for railway extensions to the network. The first proposed project involves heavy rail, the current mode used by Marta. The Red Line will be extended from its current terminus at North Springs towards Alpharetta. It would cross over metropolitan route 400 twice. Stops are proposed at Northridge, Holcomb Bridge, Mansell, North Point Mall, Old Milton, and Windward Parkway. Funding is also depending on an $8 billion grant. The second proposal is for commuter rail, a form of rail, though long proposed, currently doesn't operate with Marta. The line extending to Clayton  County The line will have stations at East Point (connections to Red and Gold rapid rail lines), Mountainview ( for int. Terminal F) Forest Park, Fort Gillem, Clayton State, Morrow, Southlake and Jonesboro with Justice Center and Lovejoy a later phase. The line is being pitched as commuter rail though what type (EMU, DMU, etc.) is unknown. Agreements are being worked on with Norfolk Southern who owns the track. Rather than a proposed grant, this project would be half government funded, half taxpayer.

See also

References

 
Transportation planning